Target Partners is a European venture capital fund claiming ca. €300 million under management. It is located in Munich and founded in 1999. The general partners are Waldemar Jantz, Kurt Müller, Berthold von Freyberg, and Michael Münnix.

Portfolio companies
The company predominantly invests in technology companies in the early stage or seed stage. Industry sectors include enterprise software, consumer internet, semiconductors and cleantech.

 1-2-3.tv
  
  

  (acquired by Swisscom)
 
 Cube Optics AG (acquired by Huber+Suhner)	
 
 Dedrone
 Falcon.io (acquired by Cision)
 Finanzchef24 
 Simplaex
  (acquired by Nokia, now part of Ovi)
 G-Predictive
 
 JouleX (acquired by Cisco)
 Instana
 
 Mercateo
NavVis
 Nawotec (acquired by Carl Zeiss AG)
 NXN Software (acquired by Avid Technology)
  Quobyte
 Scanbot
 Scoreloop (acquired by Research In Motion)
 Senic
 Sicoya
 So1
 Swarm64
 tado°	
 Theva	
 Treasury Intelligence Solutions
 
 Ubitexx (acquired by Research In Motion)
 WLAN AG (acquired by Swisscom)

References

External links

Portfolio companies

Venture capital firms of Germany
Companies based in Bavaria